The Changhua Arts Hall is an art gallery in Changhua City, Changhua County, Taiwan.

Architecture
The art gallery is housed in the Jungshan Hall, a quaint building dating back several decades. The building also doubles as a performance theater, lecture hall, and art gallery. The museum's premises also have a 300-year-old well, known as the Ang-mo Well (紅毛井). It is the last remaining well of the several built by the Dutch. This link with the Dutch gives it the name Ang-mo, which means 'red hair' in Taiwanese.

Transportation
The art gallery is accessible within walking distance east from Changhua Station of the Taiwan Railways.

See also
 List of museums in Taiwan

References

External links

  

1991 establishments in Taiwan
Art museums and galleries in Taiwan
Changhua City
Theatres in Taiwan